Harivarasanam Award is an award jointly instituted by the Government of Kerala and Travancore Devaswom Board. It is awarded for contributions towards propagation of secularism, equanimity and universal brotherhood of Sabarimala through music. It is being awarded since 2012. Each year, Harivarasanam Award is announced ahead of Makaravilakku festival in Sabarimala. The award consists of cash prize of 1 lakh, citations and plaque.
The award was named after Harivarasanam.

Award recipients

References

Indian music awards
Kerala awards
Sabarimala
Awards established in 2012
2012 establishments in Kerala